Tornike or Thornike is a masculine Georgian name.

People
Tornike Eristavi, Georgian general, monk and founder of Iviron Monastery in Greece 
Tornike Shengelia (born 1991), Georgian basketball player 
Tornike Gordadze, Georgian politician
Tornike Rizhvadze, Georgian politician 
Tornike Kipiani, Georgian singer
Tornike Gorgiashvili, Georgian football player 
Tornike Grigalashvili, Georgian football player 
Tornike Aptsiauri, Georgian football player 
Tornike Jalaghonia, Georgian rugby union player 
Tornike Mataradze, Georgian rugby union player 
Tornike Okriashvili, Georgian football player
Tornike Zoidze, Georgian rugby union player
Georgian masculine given names